Yuriy Bakalov (born 16 January 1966 in Kyiv, in the Ukrainian SSR of the Soviet Union - in present-day Ukraine) is a former Soviet and Ukrainian professional football midfielder and manager.

Career
On 16 April 2010, Bakalov was appointed as interim coach to the Ukrainian Premier League club FC Arsenal Kyiv and on 18 May 2010 confirmed as main coach.

References

External links
 Info and profile at Football.ua Site (Rus)
 Profile at Official FFU Site (Ukr)
 Profile at KLISF.info Site (Rus)
 

1966 births
Living people
Footballers from Kyiv
Soviet footballers
Ukrainian footballers
FC Ros Bila Tserkva players
FC Torpedo Zaporizhzhia players
FC Metalurh Zaporizhzhia players
FC Podillya Khmelnytskyi players
FC Nyva Myronivka players
NK Veres Rivne players
FC Dnipro Cherkasy players
FC Kremin Kremenchuk players
FC Dnipro Kyiv players
Association football midfielders
Association football defenders
Ukrainian football managers
Ukrainian Premier League managers
FC Arsenal Kyiv managers
FC Cherkashchyna managers
FC Zugdidi managers
FC Lviv managers
FC Rukh Lviv managers
Ukrainian expatriate football managers
Expatriate football managers in Georgia (country)
Ukrainian expatriate sportspeople in Georgia (country)
Soviet First League players
Soviet Second League players
Ukrainian Premier League players
Ukrainian First League players
Ukrainian Second League players